Mita Dam is a gravity dam located in Shimane Prefecture in Japan. The dam is used for flood control and water supply. The catchment area of the dam is 2.2 km2. The dam impounds about 4  ha of land when full and can store 391 thousand cubic meters of water. The construction of the dam was started on 1971 and completed in 1978.

References

Dams in Shimane Prefecture
1978 establishments in Japan